Frank Cross may refer to:

 Frank Moore Cross (1921–2012), professor of Hebrew at Harvard University
 Frank Cross (baseball) (1873–1932), American Major League baseball player
 F. L. Cross (Frank Leslie Cross, 1900–1968), professor of divinity at the University of Oxford